Royal Air Force Castletown or more simply RAF Castletown is a former Royal Air Force station that operated during the Second World War. Built near to Castletown in Caithness, Scotland the station opened in 1940 and closed in 1945. Initially built to provide a base for fighter cover for the Royal Navy base at Scapa Flow, it later became an air-sea rescue base as well, before closing just after the end of the war in Europe.

Air defence of Scapa Flow in 1939
At the outbreak of war, the only base available for local air defence of the hugely important Royal navy base at Scapa Flow was the naval airfield, RNAS Hatston. Hatston had no permanent aircraft allocation and was used by the Fleet Air Arm (FAA) squadrons from the Home fleet aircraft carriers when they were at Scapa Flow.  There were no RAF stations nearby and the Air Ministry took immediate steps to remedy this by requisitioning Wick Airport which became RAF Wick and by the end of September 1939 Blackburn Skua aircraft of 803 Squadron FAA were patrolling over Scapa. At the same time a site was sought for a second airfield. A site was chosen at Thurdistoft near Castletown and work began immediately on the construction of a new station, RAF Castletown.

Operational history
Castletown officially opened on 28 May 1940 as a satellite of RAF Wick. Wick was then a station in 18 Group, Coastal Command though also serving as a sector headquarters for 13 Group in Fighter Command. On 7 June 1940, Castletown ceased to be a satellite of Wick and became an operational station of 13 Group. The new station itself had its own satellite at RAF Skitten, which opened in December 1940.

The first aircraft, Hawker Hurricanes of 504 Squadron, arrived on 9 June 1940. Throughout the Battle of Britain Castletown provided air cover for Scapa with 504 Squadron being replaced by 3 Squadron and later 232 Squadron. From September to  October 1940, also 808 FAA Squadron, flying Fairey Fulmars, operated there, as one of only two FAA squadrons taking part in the Battle of Britain.

After the Battle of Britain, the threat of invasion receded but attacks on Scapa continued. In 1941 124 Squadron was formed at Castletown to provide convoy and coastal patrols.  This activity continued until 1944 when the last squadron (by coincidence 504 Squadron) left and the station began to be wound down. The last known aircraft to visit the station was a Sikorsky Hoverfly helicopter of 771 Squadron FAA in March 1945 and the station closed soon after.

As fighter activity decreased Castletown became a base for air-sea rescue duties with 282 Squadron being raised specifically for this purpose at Castletown in 1943.  282 Squadron was replaced by 278 Squadron in 1944.

Ground defence of the station was initially provided by army units but from 1942 onwards No. 2816 Squadron RAF Regiment fulfilled these duties.

Squadrons based at station

The following RAF Regiment units were here at some point:
 No. 2833 Squadron RAF Regiment
 No. 2877 Squadron RAF Regiment

References

Citations

Bibliography

Royal Air Force stations of World War II in the United Kingdom
Royal Air Force stations in Scotland
Caithness
Defunct airports in Scotland
Airports established in 1940